Alan Harris Goldman (born 1945) is an American philosopher and William R. Kenan Jr. Professor of Philosophy at the College of William & Mary.
He is known for his works on philosophy and popular culture, literature, morality, love, and beauty.

Books
 Life's Values: Pleasure, Happiness, Well-Being, Meaning, Oxford University Press, 2018
 Philosophy and the Novel, Oxford University Press, 2013
 Reasons from Within, Oxford University Press, 2009
 Practical Rules: When We Need Them and When We Don't, Cambridge University Press, 2002
 Aesthetic Value, Westview Press, 1995
 Moral Knowledge, Routledge & Kegan Paul, 1988
 Empirical Knowledge, University of California Press, 1988
 The Moral Foundations of Professional Ethics, Rowman and Littlefield, 1980
 Justice and Reverse Discrimination, Princeton University Press, 1979
 Mark Twain and Philosophy (ed.), Rowman and Littlefield, 2017

References

External links
Alan H. Goldman

21st-century American philosophers
Analytic philosophers
Philosophy academics
Living people
1945 births
Philosophy journal editors
Fellows of the National Endowment for the Humanities
ACLS Fellows
Philosophers of art
Philosophers of literature
Philosophers of sexuality
Philosophers of love